The Nigerien National Guard, formerly known as the  (1997-2011) and  (1963-1997), is a paramilitary corps of the Armed Forces of Niger under the control of the Ministry of Interior, Public Safety and Decentralization. It is headed by the superior commander of the national guard.

History 
The National Guard was first created in 1963 as the Republican Guard under the presidency of President Diori Hamani. Due to its loyalty to President Hamani, following the 1974 coup by President Seyni Kountche, it was restructured to ensure loyalty to Seyni Kountche. During those years, the guard was primarily tasked of protecting the president and was made up of elite soldiers trained by Moroccan officers. After the 1995 peace agreements between the government of Niger and the Touareg rebel groups, it was restructured and renamed to "Forces Nationales d'Interventions and Securite (FNIS)". Ex-rebel members were reinserted into this body as per the terms of the peace agreements. Previously under the authority of Ministry of Defense, the national guard was transferred under the authority of the Ministry of Interior in 2003. Faithful to their tradition, the National Guard remained loyal to President Tandja Mamadou in his attempt to prolong his presidency beyond the constitutional limits of his term. Later, during the 2010 military coup, the National Guard unsuccessfully defended President Tandja Mamadou. In 2010 and 2011, several government decrees and ordinances proceeded to its reorganization and renaming to the National Guard of Niger.

Mission 

The mission of the national guard of Niger is defined by ordinance n°201-61 of October 7, 2010 and consists of: 
 monitoring the national territory
 maintaining public safety and restoring public order
 protecting public buildings, people and their property
 participating in defense emergency preparedness
 carrying out judiciaries and administrative inquiries 
 conducting policing duties in rural areas and pastorals
 providing honor services for the authorities 
 providing protection to republican institutions
 participating in the operational territorial defense
 providing administration, management and monitoring of prisons
 participating in development activities in the country (i.e. humanitarian operations)
 participating in peacekeeping in international commitments made by the Niger,
 protecting the environment
 searching and detecting offenses under the criminal laws
 providing assistance to administrative authorities and the diplomatic and consular representations of Niger

References

Military of Niger